Manuscript Society is a senior  society at Yale University in New Haven, Connecticut. Toward the end of each academic year 16 rising seniors are inducted into the society, which meets twice weekly for dinner and discussion. Manuscript is reputedly the "Arts and letters" society at Yale.

History and traditions
Founded in 1952, Manuscript was Yale's seventh "landed" senior society; that is, its alumni trust owns the society's meeting place or "tomb". Manuscript was one of the first of the senior societies to offer membership to rising female Yale College seniors.

Each delegation is selected by consensus among Manuscript alumni, trustees, current delegates and significant others, unlike other Yale societies where undergraduate members more freely select, recruit, and initiate their society's next delegation.

The Wrexham Foundation is the society's alumni arm. Since 1956, the foundation has underwritten a scholarship in the humanities for a "senior who shall be judged to have written the best senior essay in the field of the humanities." Administered by Yale, it is given in memory of Wallace Notestein, M.A. 1903, Ph.D. 1908, Litt.D. 1951.

Manuscript briefly played host to the 1991-92 classes of Skull and Bones, who were temporarily locked out of their own tomb by alumni who objected to its undergraduates' decision to offer membership to women.

It holds the number 344 to be sacred. The Society supposedly holds Enlightenment ideals, and the sun and sunflowers are both important symbols to members. From its beginning the society also retained close connections with campus literary society Chi Delta Theta, which itself had been formed in 1821.

The society holds an annual gathering in its tomb on Halloween. A Manuscript event is described in the novel Joe College by Tom Perrotta.

Manuscript is part of a four-society "Consortium" with the Aurelian Honor Society, Book and Snake and Berzelius.

Architecture
Designed by King-lui Wu, Manuscript's tomb is mid-century modern, unusual amid other societies' elaborate mid-to-late-19th century buildings. It appears from the outside to have only one level, yet conceals several subterranean floors. The tomb holds a vast collection of notable modern and contemporary art. The Yale University Art Gallery is said to have temporarily stored pieces there.  Wu said that he designed the building "for privacy, not for secrecy." Dan Kiley was responsible for landscaping and Josef Albers for the brickwork intaglio mural.

Notable members

See also
Collegiate secret societies in North America

References

Sources
Robbins, Alexandra. Secrets of the Tomb: Skull and Bones, the Ivy League, and the Hidden Paths of Power. (Back Bay Books : 2003). 
Architectural Record, November 1965. "Ingenious Use of a Narrow Site".

1952 establishments in Connecticut
Secret societies at Yale
Student organizations established in 1952